SpongeBob SquarePants is an American animated television series that has aired on Nickelodeon since May 1, 1999. Created by marine biologist and animator Stephen Hillenburg, the show chronicles the adventures and endeavors of the title character and his various friends in the fictional underwater city of Bikini Bottom. Many of the ideas for the show originated in an unpublished, educational comic book titled The Intertidal Zone, which Hillenburg created in the mid-1980s. SpongeBob SquarePants features the voices of Tom Kenny, Clancy Brown, Rodger Bumpass, Bill Fagerbakke, Mr. Lawrence, Jill Talley, Carolyn Lawrence, Mary Jo Catlett and Lori Alan. It is executive produced by Hillenburg and formerly by Paul Tibbitt, who also functioned as its showrunner from the fourth season to the ninth.

Since its debut, SpongeBob SquarePants has earned widespread critical acclaim, and has been noted for its appeal towards different age groups. It has also received a variety of different award nominations, including 17 Annie Awards (with six wins), 17 Golden Reel Awards (with eight wins), 18 Emmy Awards (with five wins), 21 Kids' Choice Awards (with 20 wins), five BAFTA Children's Awards (with two wins), three Television Critics Association Awards (with one win), and two Producers Guild of America Awards.

Voice cast members Catlett, Kenny and Bumpass have each received nominations for their voice acting performances. Kenny is the most decorated actor in the cast. The SpongeBob SquarePants Movie, a feature-length film released in 2004, has received 11 award nominations, with two wins coming from the American Society of Composers, Authors and Publishers and the Australian Kids' Choice Awards. The stand-alone sequel released in 2015 garnered an additional five nominations. The stage musical adaptation opened in Broadway in 2018 won 12 awards. In total, the SpongeBob SquarePants franchise won 218 prizes including 75 victories and trophies.

Awards for SpongeBob SquarePants

Annie Awards
The Annie Awards are accolades annually presented by ASIFA-Hollywood recognizing excellence in the field of animation. First awarded in 1972, it deems itself as "animation's highest honor." SpongeBob SquarePants has received 17 Annie Award nominations, with six wins.

British Academy Children's Awards
Awarded since 1969, the British Academy Children's Awards are annual accolades bestowed by members of the British Academy of Film and Television Arts (BAFTA) recognizing excellence in children's media.  SpongeBob SquarePants was nominated for five awards with two wins.

Emmy Awards
Awarded since 1949, the Primetime Emmy Award recognizes outstanding achievements in American prime time television programming. The accolade is annually bestowed by members of the Academy of Television Arts & Sciences. Awards presented for accomplishments in daytime television programming are designated "Daytime Emmy Awards." To date, the show has been nominated for 26 Emmy Awards, with six wins (one in 2010, one in 2014, two in 2018, one in 2020 and one in 2022).

Primetime Emmy Awards

Daytime Emmy Awards

Children's and Family Emmy Awards

Golden Reel Awards
The Golden Reel Awards are annual accolades presented by the American Motion Picture Sound Editors since 1953, honoring the year's best work in the field of sound editing. Since the show's debut, it has received 17 Golden Reel Award nominations, with eight wins.

y

Kids' Choice Awards
The Kids' Choice Awards is an awards show recognizing the year's best television, film, video games and music acts, as chosen by Nickelodeon viewers. First awarded in 1988, it has been described as "the loudest, sloppiest and funniest awards show around." The American awards show also has been localized in many countries. To date, SpongeBob SquarePants has won 20 Kids' Choice Awards, including fifteen straight in the Favorite Cartoon category. In 2008 SpongeBob's record ended; however, it was regained from 2009 onward.

International versions

Other awards

Awards for films

The SpongeBob SquarePants Movie

The SpongeBob SquarePants Movie is the first film adaptation of the television series. It was released on November 19, 2004, and has been a financial success, grossing over $140,000,000 worldwide.

The SpongeBob Movie: Sponge Out of Water
The SpongeBob Movie: Sponge Out of Water is the second film adaptation of the series. It was released on February 6, 2015, and a total worldwide gross of $325.1 million.

Awards for the musical

SpongeBob SquarePants: The Broadway Musical is the Broadway run of the stage musical adaptation of the series. The musical opened to critical acclaim, and tied with Mean Girls for the most-nominated production at the 72nd Tony Awards in 2018

1 Tied with Bartlett Sher for My Fair Lady

References

Works cited

External links
Awards for SpongeBob SquarePants at the Internet Movie Database
Awards for The SpongeBob SquarePants Movie at the Internet Movie Database

Lists of awards by animated television series
Awards and nominations